The Small Town Guy is a 1917 American silent comedy film directed by Lawrence C. Windom and starring Taylor Holmes, Helen Ferguson and Fred Tiden.

Cast
 Taylor Holmes as Ernest Gledhill
 Helen Ferguson as Eleanor Ramsdell
 Fred Tiden as Swell Dresser
 Mark Ellison as Slim McClearn 
 James F. Fulton as Major Dymon

References

Bibliography
 Robert B. Connelly. The Silents: Silent Feature Films, 1910-36, Volume 40, Issue 2. December Press, 1998.

External links
 

1917 films
1917 comedy films
1910s English-language films
American silent feature films
Silent American comedy films
American black-and-white films
Films directed by Lawrence C. Windom
Essanay Studios films
1910s American films